The 2007–08 Taça de Portugal was the 68th edition of the Portuguese football knockout tournament, organized by the Portuguese Football Federation (FPF). The 2007–08 Taça de Portugal began on 2 September 2007. The final was played on 18 May 2008 at the Estádio Nacional.

Sporting CP were the previous holders, having defeated Belenenses 1–0  in the previous season's final. Sporting CP regained the Taça de Portugal by defeating Porto, 2–0 in the final to win there fifteenth Taça de Portugal. By winning the Taça de Portugal, Sporting CP qualified for the 2008 Supertaça Cândido de Oliveira.

Format and schedule

  Os Marítimos (IV) did not participate in the competition.
  Marítimo B (III) was unable to compete in the domestic cup competition due to the possibility of encountering their senior side in the competition.

Teams

Primeira Liga

 Académica de Coimbra
 Belenenses
 Benfica
 Boavista
 Braga
 Estrela da Amadora
 Leixões
 Marítimo

 Nacional
 Naval
 Paços de Ferreira
 Porto
 Sporting CP
 União de Leiria
 Vitória de Guimarães
 Vitória de Setúbal

Liga de Honra

 Beira-Mar
 Desportivo das Aves
 Estoril
 Fátima
 Feirense
 Freamunde
 Gil Vicente
 Gondomar

 Olhanense
 Penafiel
 Portimonense
 Rio Ave
 Santa Clara
 Trofense
 Varzim
 Vizela

Second Division
Série A

 Camacha
 Chaves
 Fafe
 Ribeirão
 Lixa
 Lousada
 Machico

 Maria da Fonte
 Merelinense
 Moreirense
 Portosantense
 Tirsense
 União da Madeira
 Valdevez

Série B

 Avanca
 Caniçal
 Esmoriz
 Fiães
 Infesta
 Leça

 Lusitânia Lourosa
 Oliveirense
 Pontassolense
 Ribeira Brava
 Sporting de Espinho
 Vila Meã

Série C

 Abrantes
 Anadia
 Benfica Castelo Branco
 Caldas
 Eléctrico
 Nelas
 Oliveira do Bairro

 Pampilhosa
 Penalva do Castelo
 Rio Maior
 Sátão
 Sporting da Covilhã
 Torreense
 Tourizense

Série D

 Atlético CP
 Carregado
 Juventude Évora
 Lagoa
 Louletano
 Lusitânia
 Madalena

 Mafra
 Messinense
 Odivelas
 Olivais Moscavide
 Operário
 Pinhalnovense
 Real

Third Division
Série A

 Vieira
 Mirandela
 Vianense
 Mondinense
 Joane
 Bragança
 Marinhas

 Macedo de Cavaleiros
 Vidago
 Valenciano
 Amares
 Prado
 Brito
 Morais

Série B

 AD Oliveirense
 Amarante
 Padroense
 Paredes
 Aliados Lordelo
 Serzedelo
 Torre de Moncorvo

 Rebordosa
 Nogueirense
 São Pedro da Cova
 Oliveira do Douro
 Pedras Rubras
 Famalicão
 Maia

Série C

 Académico de Viseu
 Arouca
 Dragões Sandinenses
 Ginásio Figueirense
 Milheiroense
 Oliveira do Hospital
 Sanjoanense

 São João de Ver
 Social Lamas
 Tocha
 Tondela
 União de Lamas
 Valecambrense
 Valonguense

Série D

 Alcobaça
 Caranguejeira
 Gândara
 Lousanense
 Marinhense
 Mirandense
 Monsanto

 Penamacorense
 Portomosense
 Sertanense
 Sourense
 Sporting de Pombal
 Unhais da Serra
 União da Serra

Série E

 1º Dezembro
 Alcochetense
 Atlético Cacém
 Bombarralense
 Câmara de Lobos
 Cartaxo
 Estrela Portalegre

 Estrela Vendas Novas
 Fazendense
 Igreja Nova
 O Elvas
 Oriental
 Santana
 Sintrense

Série F

 Aljustrelense
 Almancilense
 Amora
 Barreirense
 Beira-Mar de Monte Gordo
 Campinense
 Cova da Piedade

 Fabril
 Ferreiras
 Imortal
 Lusitano
 Quarteirense
 Silves
 União Montemor

Série Azores

 Angrense
 Boavista São Mateus
 Capelense
 Fayal
 Lajense

 Praiense
 Rabo de Peixe
 Santiago
 União Micaelense

District Leagues

 Aguiar da Beira
 Águias do Moradal
 Alvorense
 Ansião
 Boticas
 Bustelo
 Candal
 Campomaiorense
 Cinfães
 Flamengos

 Freiria
 Mirandês
 Monção
 Monte Trigo
 Moura
 Ouriquense
 Santa Eulália
 Sesimbra
 Velense
 Vigor Mocidade

First round
For the first round draw, teams were drawn against each other in accordance to their geographical location. The draw was split up into four sections: teams from the north, the center, the south and the Azores region. All first round cup ties were played on the 2 September. Due to the odd number of matches involved at this stage of the competition, Fayal, Maia, Mirandense, Penamacorense and Torre de Moncorvo progressed to the next round. The first round of the cup saw teams from the Terceira Divisão (IV) start the competition alongside some teams who registered to participate in the cup from the Portuguese District Leagues (V).

North Zone

|}

Central Zone

|}

South Zone

|}

Azores Zone

|}

Second round
Ties were played on the 23 September. Due to the odd number of matches at this stage of the competition, 1º Dezembro, Abrantes, Cova da Piedade, Merelinense, Monção, Padroense, Pampilhosa,  Rio Maior, Sátão and Valecambrense qualified for the third round. The second round saw teams from the Portuguese Second Division (III) enter the competition.

Série A

|}

Série B

|}

Série C

|}

Série D

|}

Third round
Ties were played on the 7–18 November. Due to the odd number of matches at this stage of the competition, Olhanense and Tocha qualified for the fourth round. The third round saw teams from the Liga de Honra (II) enter the competition.

|}

Fourth round
Ties were played on the 7–9 December. Due to the odd number of matches at this stage of the competition, Boavista and Marítimo qualified for the fifth round. The fourth round saw teams from the Primeira Liga (I) enter the competition.

|}

Fifth round
Ties were played on the 19–20 January. Due to the odd number of participants involved at this stage of the competition, Valdevez qualified for the quarter finals due to having no opponent to face.

Sixth round
Ties were played on the 9–10 February. Due to the odd number of participants involved at this stage of the competition, Estrela da Amadora qualified for the quarter finals due to having no opponent to face.

Quarter-finals
Ties were played on the 27 February.

Semi-finals
Ties were played on the 15–16 April.

Final

References

Taça de Portugal seasons
Taca De Portugal, 2007-08
2007–08 domestic association football cups